In law and ethics, universal law or universal principle refers to concepts of legal legitimacy actions, whereby those principles and rules for governing human beings' conduct which are most universal in their acceptability, their applicability, translation, and philosophical basis, are therefore considered to be most legitimate.

The universal law of human functionality should also serve as a principle that drives global communities to sustainable development goals, if the educational institutions diligently apply this principle to assist in the development of students in all grades and levels of studies, to resonate and bringing to their focus the positive objectives of their studies and pointing to them, the relationship between increasing knowledge of their objectives studies goals and achieving the goals.

This can be done by consciously reminding the students that, their proper functionality in their desired field of endeavour, which will result in their contribution to the world communities at large and their satisfaction of being fulfilled in their field of endeavours, depends on the degree of their increase in the knowledge related to their fields of educational studies and constantly application of the ACQUIRED knowledge of their field of studies.

The universal law of human functionality vs global sustainable development

Understanding the  relationship between knowledge application which is the observable action that will lead to various reactions, should assist us to,  Understanding the key issues towards global sustainable development.

Debate

Cognition, experiences and intuition are the starting points of legal thought, which has to be seen through the glasses of universality and abstractness. Notwithstanding this assumption, "legal principles 1) do not contain only logic and reason and that 2) they can be different in different situations despite their equal naming. The legal rules can be identical in different legal orders while they carry different wants".

On one side "universality, abstraction, and theory itself are defined in a way that undermines the perspectives of some while privileging the perspectives of others"; on the other side, "the aspiration to universality itself may stand in the way of its realization if it seals off from view the bias built into legal norms, public practices, and established institutions".

Examples
One type of Universal Law is the Law of Logic which prohibits logical contradictions known as sophistry.  The Law of Logic is based upon the universal idea that logic is defined as that which is not illogical and that which is illogical is that which involves a logical contradiction, such as attempting to assert that an apple and no apple can exist at and in the same time and in the same place and attempting to assert that A and not-A can exist at and in the same time and in the same place.

References

See also
 Natural law
 Universality (philosophy)

Ethics
Philosophy of law
Theories of law